Walter Borchers  (22 January 1916 – 6 March 1945) was a German Luftwaffe military aviator and wing commander during World War II. As a flying ace, he was credited with 59 aerial victories, including 43 nocturnal victories, 10 as a destroyer pilot and 6 four-engined bombers at day time, claimed in roughly 300 combat missions. Prior to his death he held the position of wing commander of the 5th Night Fighter Wing.

Biography
Walter Borchers was born on 22 January 1916 in Ofen in Ammerland, Duchy of Oldenburg as the third of three brothers, all of whom would be awarded the Knight’s Cross of the Iron Cross during the course of World War II. His brother, Major Adolf Borchers received the Knight's Cross on 22 November 1944 as Staffelkapitän of 11./Jagdgeschwader 51 "Mölders". A second brother, SS-Hauptsturmführer Hermann Borchers received the Knight's Cross on 16 October 1944 as commander of the I. Battalion of the SS-Panzergrenadier-Regiment 19.

Borchers was a member of the 5th Staffel (squadron) of Zerstörergeschwader 76 (ZG 76—76th Destroyer Wing) at the outbreak of World War II on 1 September 1939. He became the Staffelkapitän of 5./ZG 76 in the fall of 1940. He claimed 10 aerial victories during the Battle of France and Battle of Britain.

Night fighter career

Following the 1939 aerial Battle of the Heligoland Bight, RAF attacks shifted to the cover of darkness, initiating the Defence of the Reich campaign. By mid-1940, Generalmajor (Brigadier General) Josef Kammhuber had established a night air defense system dubbed the Kammhuber Line. It consisted of a series of control sectors equipped with radars and searchlights and an associated night fighter. Each sector named a Himmelbett (canopy bed) would direct the night fighter into visual range with target bombers. In 1941, the Luftwaffe started equipping night fighters with airborne radar such as the Lichtenstein radar. This airborne radar did not come into general use until early 1942.

Borchers' Staffel was transformed to the 8. Staffel of Nachtjagdgeschwader 3 (NJG 3—3rd Night Fighter Wing) in the fall of 1941, flying night fighter missions in Defence of the Reich. Borchers claimed his first nocturnal aerial victory on the night of 3 March 1943. He claimed his 12th and 15th against the United States Army Air Forces (USAAF) heavies—four-engined strategic bombers—in 1943. Still an Oberleutnant, he was made Gruppenkommandeur of the III./Nachtjagdgeschwader 5 (NJG 5—5th Night Fighter Wing) on 22 April 1943, leading the Gruppe (group) until 15 March 1944. In this position he claimed a further six nocturnal victories and four heavy USAAF bombers shot down.

Wing commander
He was promoted to Major and took command of NJG 5 as Geschwaderkommodore (wing commander) on 15 March, succeeding Egmont Prinz zur Lippe-Weißenfeld. He received the Knight's Cross of the Iron Cross on 27 July 1944 by which time he had achieved 45 aerial victories in total.

Having claimed an Avro Lancaster, Borchers was shot down and killed in action on the night of 6 March 1945 by a long-range British night fighter north of Altenburg. Flying  Junkers Ju 88 G-6 "C9+GA" (Werknummer 622 319—factory number) his air gunner parachuted to safety while his radio operator Leutnant Friedrich Reul was also killed. Borchers had been nominated for the Oak Leaves to the Knight's Cross which he never received. His victors were Wing Commander Walter Gibb and Flying Officer Kendall of No 239 Squadron, Royal Air Force (RAF), part of No. 100 Group RAF, flying a de Havilland Mosquito night fighter

Summary of career

Aerial victory claims
According to US historian David T. Zabecki, Borchers was credited with 59 aerial victories. Foreman, Parry and Mathews, authors of Luftwaffe Night Fighter Claims 1939 – 1945, researched the German Federal Archives and found records for 32 nocturnal victory claims. Mathews and Foreman also published Luftwaffe Aces — Biographies and Victory Claims, listing Borchers with additional eleven aerial victories claimed as a Zerstörer pilot.

Victory claims were logged to a map-reference (PQ = Planquadrat), for example "PQ 4317". These sectors were then subdivided into 36 smaller units to give a location area 3 × 4 km in size.

Awards
 Iron Cross (1939) 2nd and 1st Class
 German Cross in Gold on 12 July 1943 as Oberleutnant in the 8./Nachtjagdgeschwader 3
 Knight's Cross of the Iron Cross on 27 July 1944 as Major and Gruppenkommandeur of the III./Nachtjagdgeschwader 5.

References

Citations

Bibliography

 
 
 
 
 
 
 
 
 
 Scutts, Jerry (1998). German Night Fighter Aces of World War 2. Osprey Publishing. .
 
 
 
 
 

1916 births
1945 deaths
People from Ammerland
Luftwaffe pilots
People from Oldenburg (state)
German World War II flying aces
Luftwaffe personnel killed in World War II
Aviators killed by being shot down
Recipients of the Gold German Cross
Recipients of the Knight's Cross of the Iron Cross
Military personnel from Lower Saxony